Chad May (born September 28, 1971) is a former American football quarterback for the Minnesota Vikings in the National Football League in 1995 and the Arizona Cardinals in 1996.   He joined the World League of American Football's Frankfurt Galaxy in 1997.  May played for the Arizona Rattlers in the Arena Football League in 1999 and 2001.  He played college football at Kansas State in 1993 and 1994.

High school career
May attended Damien High School in La Verne, California.  While there, he completed 126-of-254 passes for 1,801 yards and 12 touchdowns as a senior.  He earned all-league, all-city and All-San Gabriel Valley honors.  He also earned all-league honors as a shortstop on the baseball team, hitting .489 as a senior.

College career
May initially played as a freshman at Cal State Fullerton in 1991, and won the starting job in the third game of the season and guided Fullerton to a 17–10 win over Cal State Northridge.  He completed 97 of 233 passes (41.6%) on the year for 1,066 yards and threw four touchdowns and nine interceptions. He transferred to Kansas State prior to the 1992 season.  He sat out the entire season due to NCAA rules.

May earned All-Big Eight honors in 1993 and 1994 while leading Kansas State to back-to-back bowl appearances.  He threw for a school-record 2,682 yards (a mark since broken by Michael Bishop followed by Josh Freeman) in 1993 as Kansas State went 9-2-1 with a 52-17 Copper Bowl victory over Wyoming in the Wildcats' first bowl appearance in 11 years. He passed for 2,571 yards in 1994 as Kansas State went 9-3 and lost 12–7 to Boston College in the 1994 Aloha Bowl. He also set a school single-game record with 489 passing yards in a 45–28 loss to Nebraska in 1993.

College statistics

References

1971 births
Living people
Sportspeople from West Covina, California
American football quarterbacks
Kansas State Wildcats football players
Frankfurt Galaxy players
Arizona Rattlers players
Players of American football from California
People from La Verne, California